Amanuel is a given name or a surname. 

Notable people with the given name include:
Amanuel Gebrezgabihier (born 1994), Eritrean cyclist
Amanuel Melles (born 1993), Eritrean academic based in Canada
Amanuel Mesel (born 1990), Eritrean long-distance runner

Notable people with the surname include:
Meron Amanuel (born 1990), Eritrean cyclist

African given names